Ideal Clothiers Ground was a cricket ground in Wellingborough, Northamptonshire.  The ground was constructed by Ideal Clothiers, a clothes making company based in Wellingborough.  The first and only first-class match on the ground was in 1929, when Northamptonshire played Oxford University.

The ground fell out of use in the 1970s.

References

External links
Ideal Clothiers Ground on CricketArchive
Ideal Clothiers Ground on Cricinfo

Defunct cricket grounds in England
Cricket grounds in Northamptonshire
Wellingborough
Defunct sports venues in Northamptonshire
Sports venues completed in 1929